Izaaq Izhan bin Yuswardi (born 23 January 1995) is a Malaysian professional footballer who plays as a defender for Malaysia Super League club PDRM.

Izaaq has played before for PDRM, Negeri Sembilan and Perak.

References

External links 
 

1995 births
Living people
People from Kuala Lumpur
Malaysian footballers
Association football defenders
Negeri Sembilan FA players
Perak F.C. players
Malaysia Super League players